Leif Wahlstedt (born 31 March 1946) is a Swedish former ice sledge hockey player. He won medals for Sweden at the 1994 Winter Paralympics, 1998 Winter Paralympics and 2002 Winter Paralympics.

References

Living people
Paralympic sledge hockey players of Sweden
Swedish sledge hockey players
Paralympic bronze medalists for Sweden
Paralympic gold medalists for Sweden
1946 births
Medalists at the 1994 Winter Paralympics
Medalists at the 1998 Winter Paralympics
Medalists at the 2002 Winter Paralympics
Paralympic medalists in sledge hockey
Ice sledge hockey players at the 1994 Winter Paralympics
Ice sledge hockey players at the 1998 Winter Paralympics
Ice sledge hockey players at the 2002 Winter Paralympics
People from Södertälje
Sportspeople from Stockholm County
20th-century Swedish people
21st-century Swedish people